The Nissan Lannia is a compact sedan produced by the Japanese car company Nissan, which was designed specifically for the Chinese market.

Concept and design 

At Auto China 2014 in Beijing, Nissan had presented the first design for a new compact model called "Friend-ME". At the same show, Nissan had presented a concept design called Lannia. At the Auto Shanghai 2015, Nissan showed a production model for the first time, whose design remained very close to the concept design. This show was honored as "Best New Model to Come". Nissan has designed the Lannia to appeal to people between 20 and 30 years old.

Production version 

The production version of the Nissan Lannia is produced by Dongfeng Motor Co., Ltd. (DFL), Nissan’s joint venture in China.
The Nissan Lannia is powered by a 1.6-liter,  inline-four gasoline engine coupled with an Xtronic CVT Transmission. The Lannia also features high-performance suspension, EPS (Electric Power Steering), and VDC (Vehicle Dynamics Control) systems.

Equipment 
The Lannia offers a safety package with parking space monitoring, Lane Keeping Assist, and Blind Spot Assist.

References

Lannia
Cars introduced in 2015
Compact cars
Sedans
Cars of China
2010s cars
Vehicles with CVT transmission